Robert Scarlett (born 14 January 1979) is a Jamaican former professional footballer who played as a defender or midfielder.

Career

Club
Scarlett was born in Kingston. A small, but speedy, left-sided attacking defender, he played for Harbour View in his native Jamaica before signing for Russian Premier League side Spartak Moscow on a six-month contract, with the option of a three-year extension, in August 2002. After returning to Harbour View following his six-months with Spartak Moscow, Scarlett joined Major League Soccer side Real Salt Lake in July 2005. For Spartak, he only played one league game as a second-half substitute against Saturn Ramenskoe; he also made Spartak's UEFA Champions League roster but did not feature in any of their games.

International
Scarlett appeared for the 'Reggae Boyz', making his debut in 1999 against Costa Rica and playing his last international so far in 2005 against Australia.

Career statistics

Club

Honours

Club
Harbour View
 National Premier League: 2000, 2007
 JFF Champions Cup: 2001, 2002

References

External links
 Profile at Reggaeboyzsc
 Profile at TheReggaeboyz
 

Living people
1979 births
Association football midfielders
Association football defenders
Jamaican footballers
Real Salt Lake players
FC Spartak Moscow players
Harbour View F.C. players
Russian Premier League players
Major League Soccer players
TT Pro League players
Jamaica international footballers
2005 CONCACAF Gold Cup players
Jamaican expatriate footballers
Expatriate footballers in Russia
Expatriate soccer players in the United States
Expatriate footballers in Trinidad and Tobago